James Craven is an English rugby league footballer who currently plays for the Batley Bulldogs in the Kingstone Press Championship. He has previously played for the Keighley Cougars and Dewsbury Rams. His position is fullback.

References

External links
Batley Bulldogs profile

1988 births
Living people
Batley Bulldogs players
Dewsbury Rams players
English rugby league players
Keighley Cougars players
Oxford Rugby League players
Rugby league fullbacks